Ben Saul  is the current Challis Professor of International Law at the University of Sydney and an Australian Research Council Future Fellow. He has appeared as an advocate in international, regional and national courts outside Australia, and he is also admitted to practice as a barrister in New South Wales.  His research interests include international law, in particular, international aspects of anti-terrorism law, humanitarian law, human rights law, among others.

Early life
Saul was educated at the University of Sydney, graduating with a B.A. (Hons.) and LL.B. (Hons.), and Magdalen College, Oxford, where he received a D.Phil.

Career
Saul has published articles in various international law journals and is the author of an authoritative book, Defining Terrorism in International Law.

Saul was a member of the International Law Association’s International Committee for the Compensation of Victims of War; President of the Refugee Advice and Casework Service; Vice-President of the International Law Association (Australian Branch); Vice-President of Sydney PEN; a board member of Australian Lawyers for Human Rights; and a Member of the NSW Legal Aid Commission’s Human Rights Committee.

In November Saul was elected a Fellow of the Academy of the Social Sciences in Australia in 2022.

Books
Saul, B., "Documents in International Law: Terrorism", Hart: Oxford (2010)
Saul, B., Stephens, T., McAdam, J. and Sherwood, S., "Climate Change and Australia: Warming to the Challenge", Federation Press: Sydney ( 2010)
Nasu, H. and Saul, B. (eds), "Human Rights in the Asia-Pacific Region: Towards Institution Building", Routledge-Cavendish: Abindgon (2010)
Saul, B., "Defining Terrorism in International Law", Oxford University Press – Monographs in International Law Series: Oxford (2006), (2008 paperback)
Crock, M., Saul, B. and Dastyari, A., "Future Seekers II: Refugees and Irregular Migration in Australia", Federation Press: Sydney (2006)
Crock, M. and Saul, B., "Future Seekers: Refugees and the Law in Australia", Federation Press and the Law and Justice Foundation of NSW: Sydney (2002)

References

21st-century Australian lawyers
Living people
International law scholars
Sydney Law School alumni
Alumni of Magdalen College, Oxford
Academic staff of the University of Sydney
Academic staff of the University of New South Wales
Year of birth missing (living people)
Fellows of the Academy of the Social Sciences in Australia